Diadegma chrysostictos is a wasp first described by J.F. Gmelin in 1790.
No subspecies are listed.

References

chrysostictos
Insects described in 1790
Taxa named by Johann Friedrich Gmelin

sv:Diadegma chrysostictum